All Saints’ Church in Howick was the first parish church in Auckland and is the oldest building in Manukau. It can be found on the corner of Cook Street and Selwyn Road in the suburb of Howick, New Zealand.

The Church was built in November 1847 at a cost of 147 pounds, 3 shillings and 9 pence. The first service was held in the church on 21 November 1847, although the roof had not been finished at that stage. It was the first building to be erected in Howick.

Originally built to a cruciform plan, the nave was enlarged in 1862. The Lych gate (erected in 1930) is a memorial to those who served in the New Zealand Militias during the Land Wars of the 1860s. The building was designed by the Rev. Frederick Thatcher and pre-built in St Johns, before being moved by sea, (the easiest method of the time), to Howick where it was finally assembled. It is listed as a Category I Historic Place.

Notable burials
Many early settlers are buried in the grounds of the church. Notable burials include:
Stephen Ponsonby Peacocke (1813–1872), British officer of the Bombay Army, notable artist, and member of the New Zealand Legislative Council

References

External links

 Official site of All Saints’ Church

Churches in Auckland
Heritage New Zealand Category 1 historic places in the Auckland Region
Anglican churches in New Zealand
Frederick Thatcher church buildings
Listed churches in New Zealand
1840s architecture in New Zealand